Trevor Simion Hoyte (born 1957), is a male former athlete who competed for England.

Athletics career
Hoyte was a National champion after winning the 1979 UK Athletics Championships over 100 metres.

He represented England in the 200 metres and 4 x 100 metres relay events, at the 1978 Commonwealth Games in Edmonton, Alberta, Canada.

Personal life
He is part of a sporting family. His brother is Les Hoyte (a former international sprinter) and sister in-law is Wendy Hoyte. His nephews are Justin Hoyte and Gavin Hoyte.

References

1957 births
English male sprinters
Athletes (track and field) at the 1978 Commonwealth Games
Living people
Commonwealth Games competitors for England